Sir Arthur John Hammond Collins (14 February 1834 – 12 September 1915) was an English colonial judge who was Chief Justice of Madras.

He was born the son of John Collins and Louisa Strong Collins of Parkstone, Dorset. He was educated at Oxford University and studied law at Gray's Inn, where he was called to the bar in 1860. He was also a barrister at the Middle Temple and made Queen's Counsel (QC) in 1877. He was Treasurer of Gray's Inn in 1883 and again in 1905.

He served as Recorder of Poole from 1873 to 1879 and as Recorder of Exeter from 1879 to 1885. He was also the Chief Royal Commissioner on the inquiry into corrupt practices at the City of Chester elections. In 1885 he was appointed Chief Justice at the Madras High Court and knighted at Osborne House before he left for India. He held the post of Chief Justice until 1899, also acting as Vice-Chancellor of the University of Madras from 1889 to 1899.

He died at his home in Kensington in 1915. He had married Isabella, daughter of the Rev. Richard Wilson.

Arms

References

1834 births
1915 deaths
Alumni of the University of Oxford
Members of the Middle Temple
Members of Gray's Inn
British India judges
Knights Bachelor
Chief Justices of the Madras High Court
Vice Chancellors of the University of Madras